The New South Wales Department of Education is a department of the Government of New South Wales. In addition to other responsibilities, it operates primary and secondary schools throughout the state.

A

B

C

D

E

F

See also
 List of government schools in New South Wales: G–P
 List of government schools in New South Wales: Q–Z

References 

G A–F